Geppo il folle is a 1978 Italian musical-comedy film written, directed and starred by Adriano Celentano.

Cast 

 Adriano Celentano: Geppo
 Claudia Mori: Gilda
 Iris De Santis: mother of Geppo
 Marco Columbro: disc jockey
 Jennifer: Marcella
 Gino Santercole: journalist
 Loredana Del Santo: student
 Giorgio Faletti: student

References

External links

1978 films
Italian musical comedy films
1970s musical comedy films
Films directed by Adriano Celentano
1978 comedy films
1970s Italian films